A Quiet Street is the sixth Our Gang short subject comedy released. The Our Gang series (later known as "The Little Rascals") was created by Hal Roach in 1922, and continued production until 1944.

Synopsis
A new kid moves into town and is soon bullying little Jackie. When the gang finds this out, they beat up on the kid, only to discover that his father is a cop. Meanwhile, the police are after a criminal named Red Mike, and the gang mistakenly thinks they are the ones being chased.

Cast

The Gang
 Jackie Condon as Jackie
 Mickey Daniels as Mickey
 Jack Davis as Jack
 Ernie Morrison as Booker T.

Additional cast
 Gabe Saienz as Banty, the new kid
 Peggy Cartwright as Banty's sister
 Dick Gilbert as Mugging victim/Police officer
 William Gillespie as Police dispatcher
 Clara Guiol as Banty's mother
 Jack Hill as Red Mike
 Joseph Morrison as Booker T.'s father
 Charles Stevenson as Banty's father, the police officer
 Dinah the Mule as Herself, Booker T.'s mule

Notes
This is the last film with Peggy Cartwright.

External links
 
 

1922 films
Hal Roach Studios short films
American silent short films
American black-and-white films
1922 comedy films
Films directed by Robert F. McGowan
Our Gang films
1922 short films
1920s American films
Silent American comedy films